Reverend Frederick Ledger Frost (1887–19 July 1957) was a New Zealand politician of the Labour Party.

Biography

Early life and career
Frost was born in Northumberland, England, in 1887 and from the ages of 13 to 24 was a coal-miner in England and then Australia. He came to New Zealand in 1911, and worked in the Millerton mines before becoming a Methodist minister. He enlisted in the army during World War I he was a soldier in the 1st Otago Tunneling Corps, then became a Chaplain-Captain before being wounded in action in 1918.

He was for 14 years a Methodist minister and City Missioner in Auckland initially, but then stationed at Stratford, Dunedin, Edendale, Lyttelton and Tauranga. He changed to the Anglican Church in 1924, becoming a vicar in Taradale in 1926 until 1935.

He was President of the Taradale Returned and Services' Association from 1927 to 1934 and member of both the Hawke's Bay Education Board and Napier Boys' High School Board from 1931 to 1935. He then worked in broadcasting at the head office of the Labour Department from 1936 to 1938.

Member of Parliament

He represented the New Plymouth electorate from the 1938 general election to 1943, when he was defeated by the National candidate, Rev Ernest Aderman, who was also a Christian minister. He was the first Labour MP to represent New Plymouth in Parliament.

Later life and death
After he was defeated he moved to Auckland in 1943.

He died in Auckland on 19 July 1957, survived by his wife, son and four daughters.

Notes

References

1887 births
1957 deaths
New Zealand Labour Party MPs
People from Taranaki
New Zealand Methodist ministers
New Zealand Anglican priests
People from Northumberland
New Zealand coal miners
English emigrants to New Zealand
New Zealand military personnel of World War I
Unsuccessful candidates in the 1943 New Zealand general election
Unsuccessful candidates in the 1935 New Zealand general election
Unsuccessful candidates in the 1931 New Zealand general election
Members of the New Zealand House of Representatives
New Zealand MPs for North Island electorates